The Les Dawson Show was a variety show that aired on BBC1 intermittently from 1978 through 1989. The show starred comedian Les Dawson (1931–1993), who had previously starred in the ITV sketch comedy programme Sez Les (1969–76), followed by Dawson and Friends (1977). The Les Dawson Show also featured sketch comedy, as well as stand-up comedy, guest appearances, dance numbers, and musical performances.

Overview

Series 1–2

In the first series, transmitted in 1978, Dawson co-hosted the show with Scottish singer-songwriter Lulu. In addition to comedy sketches and songs by Dawson, Lulu, and guests artists, each episode featured performances by the Dougie Squires Dancers, with choreography by Dougie Squires. The musical director at this time was John Coleman, and the arranger was Alan Roper. Episodes of this first series aired fortnightly rather than weekly.

No new episodes of the show aired for more than three years. Then, in May 1981, BBC1 transmitted a bank holiday special that reunited Dawson with his longtime comedy compatriot Roy Barraclough, and Sez Les writer Terry Ravenscroft. It also replaced the Dougie Squires Dancers with Kids International, a multi-ethnic singing and dancing group assembled by the show's producer, Ernest Maxin. Maxin, Barraclough, and Kids International stayed with the show through its second series—which premiered eight months later, in January 1982. For series two, Alyn Ainsworth joined-on as bandleader, and musical arrangements were handled by some new contributors to the programme, including Ivor Raymonde and Max Harris. Roy Barraclough wrote and/or performed.

Later that year, Kids International got their own 30-minute Christmas special. The Kids International Show aired on 24 December 1982; Maxin produced and directed, while Alyn Ainsworth and orchestra provided music.

Series 3–4
For the third series, which aired in 1983, Maxin remained as producer, but Ronnie Hazlehurst became the show's musical director, and comedian Eli Woods joined the cast. Kids International, however, were becoming so popular there was a threat that they would upstage Dawson. Dawson said that he advocated for their removal until Maxin and Jim Moir (the BBC's head of variety) finally relented.

To replace of Kids International, Maxin conducted auditions to assemble a tap-dancing act named the Roly Polys. When the selection process was complete, the troupe had seven dancers: Marie Ashton, Bea Aston, Sue Cadman, Audrey Leybourne, Thea Macintyre, Ann Stephanie, and lead dancer Mo Moreland. As a matter of BBC policy, Maxin himself was obligated to retire when he turned 60 in 1983. Dawson was not happy with Maxin's replacement, Robin Nash. Nash was the former head of variety at the BBC, and had also served as head of comedy. Even so, Dawson and (show co-writer) Terry Ravenscroft found the man to lack an innate sense of comedy. Nash's tenure as the show's producer lasted for one series.

After BBC1 transmitted the fourth series of The Les Dawson Show in 1984, Dawson took over Terry Wogan's role as host of Blankety Blank, a comedy game show on the same channel. Meanwhile, Dawson's wife Margaret was gravely ill. She had been diagnosed with breast cancer years earlier, and finally succumbed in April 1986. After her death, Dawson swore off the "wife jokes" for which he had become known.

No new episodes of The Les Dawson Show were produced until a Christmas special in 1987. Comedy writers David Nobbs and Barry Cryer were recruited for the special, but much of the content was material rehashed from Dawson's earlier sketch comedy series, Sez Les. BBC1 repeated the special on 21 December 1988.

Series 5
Dawson was still host of Blankety Blank when The Les Dawson Show resumed for a fifth series in 1989, and he was optimistic about the show's return. He recalls taping the series premiere at the BBC's Television Centre in London: "We had a twenty-five piece orchestra under the baton of John Coleman, John Nettles to partner me in the sketches, and, as a special guest, Shirley Bassey".  Roy Barraclough was among the scriptwriters, and the show had a new producer: Stewart Morris. When the 1989 series aired, however, the ratings disappointed Dawson greatly. He ascribed the failure to a decision made by BBC1 to premiere the show during the broadcast run of Blankety Blank, rather than after. The final episode of The Les Dawson Show was a Christmas special that aired on 30 December 1989—five weeks after the series five finale, and a few days after the Blankety Blank Christmas special. Blankety Blank, too, was soon cancelled; the 1989–1990 series was its last until BBC1 revived the programme in 1998, with Paul O'Grady as host. Dawson died of a heart attack in 1993.

Episodes
In addition to five series of six episodes, there were three Christmas specials and a bank holiday special. A comedy sketch was also featured in a 1982 Christmas special called The Funny Side of Christmas.

Series 1 (1978)

Spring bank holiday special (1981)

Series 2 (1982)

Series 3 (1983)

Series 4 (1984)

Christmas special (1987)

Series 5 (1989)

Christmas special (1989)

See also

 Sez Les (1969)
 The Funny Side of Christmas (1982)
 Cissie and Ada

Notes

References

External links
 The Les Dawson Show at the BFI Film & TV Database
 

1978 British television series debuts
1989 British television series endings
1970s British television sketch shows
1980s British television sketch shows
British variety television shows
English-language television shows
BBC television comedy